The Right to Live is a 1927 Austrian-German silent film directed by Robert Wohlmuth and starring Maly Delschaft, Erna Morena, and Elizza La Porta.

The film's sets were designed by the art directors Hans Rouc and Stefan Wessely.

Cast

References

Bibliography

External links

1927 films
Films of the Weimar Republic
German silent feature films
Austrian silent feature films
Films directed by Robert Wohlmuth